Calvert Coates Pratt OBE (October 6, 1888 – November 13, 1963) was a Newfoundland businessman and a Canadian Senator. He was president of Purity Factories, a Newfoundland food manufacturer. He was also a director of Newfoundland Light and Power, the Canadian Bank of Commerce, British Newfoundland Development Corporation (BRINCO), and a number of other businesses.

He was born in Blackhead, Newfoundland. His brother was poet E. J. Pratt.

At 28, Calvert Pratt became a director and secretary-treasurer of A.E. Hickman Company Limited.

During World War II, he helped institute a ship building program for the Dominion of Newfoundland and helped form the Newfoundland Industrial Development Board serving as its president. In 1946, he was made a member of the Order of the British Empire.

Pratt was a supporter of Joey Smallwood's Newfoundland Confederate Association and its successful campaign to have the former colony join Canadian confederation in 1949.

He was appointed by Louis St-Laurent to Canada's Senate in 1951. He died in office.

References

External links

1888 births
1963 deaths
Canadian senators from Newfoundland and Labrador
Liberal Party of Canada senators
Dominion of Newfoundland people
Canadian Officers of the Order of the British Empire